Lamprey is the second album by the Dutch indie band Bettie Serveert, released in 1995.

Track listing 
"Keepsake"- 6:18
"Ray Ray Rain" – 4:22
"D. Feathers" – 5:32
"Re-feel-it" – 3:58
"21 Days" – 3:23
"Cybor *D" – 4:01
"Tell Me, Sad" – 5:18
"Crutches" – 4:52
"Something so Wild" – 2:51
"Totally Freaked Out" – 4:10
"Silent Spring" – 4:32

Personnel 

Herman Bunskoeke – bass
Peter Visser – guitar
Carol van Dijk – guitar, vocals
Berend Dubbe – drums

References

1995 albums
Bettie Serveert albums